Gary Michael Goetzman (born November 6, 1952) is an American film and television producer and actor, and co-founder of the production company Playtone with actor Tom Hanks.

Life and career
Born in Los Angeles, Goetzman began his career as a child actor. He had starred in the film Yours, Mine and Ours with Lucille Ball, appeared on The Ed Sullivan Show, and eventually started a waterbed company and pinball arcade. Goetzman at one time delivered a waterbed to Jon Peters's home. His exploits as a performer and a salesman inspired his friend Paul Thomas Anderson's 2021 film Licorice Pizza.

In 1984, he produced the Talking Heads concert film Stop Making Sense with director Jonathan Demme. That initiated a successful run as a music supervisor, on such films as Something Wild, Colors, Modern Girls and Married to the Mob, among many others. In 1991, producer Goetzman and director Demme again collaborated to make The Silence of the Lambs, which garnered the top five Academy Awards including Best Picture.

In 1993, Goetzman was executive producer of Demme's Philadelphia, starring Tom Hanks, beginning a working relationship with Hanks. Goetzman co-produced Hanks's 1996 directorial debut, That Thing You Do! The two then co-founded Playtone in 1998. Since then, Goetzman has produced hit films including My Big Fat Greek Wedding, The Polar Express, Charlie Wilson's War and Mamma Mia! Goetzman has also received several Emmy Awards for HBO mini-series Band of Brothers, The Pacific, John Adams, Game Change and Olive Kitteridge.

Aside from producing films, Goetzman has been known to play small parts in movies he is connected to.

He has also enjoyed a successful parallel career as a music composer and producer, working with such artists as Smokey Robinson, Natalie Cole, Jane Child, Thelma Houston, and The Staples Singers.

He currently sits on the National board of directors for the Producers Guild of America.

Goetzman is executive producer (with Tom Hanks and Mark Herzog) of the CNN exclusive documentary miniseries The Sixties (2014), The Seventies (2015), The Eighties (2016), and The Nineties (2017).

Filmography
He was a producer in all films unless otherwise noted.

Film

As an actor

Music department

Soundtrack

Production manager

Thanks

Television

As an actor

Soundtrack

Miscellaneous crew

Thanks

References

External links
 

1952 births
American film producers
American film studio executives
Living people
American male child actors